Federal elections were held in Germany on 10 January 1874. The National Liberal Party remained the largest party in the Reichstag, with 147 of the 397 seats. Voter turnout was 61.2%.

Results

Alsace-Lorraine

References

Federal elections in Germany
Germany
Election
Elections in the German Empire
January 1874 events